Zyranna Zateli (born 1951) is a Greek novelist born in Sochos near Thessaloniki. She attended a drama school 1976–1979 and then worked as an actress and radio producer, before becoming a full-time writer.

Awards
Both her novels were awarded with the National Book Prize for Literature 1994 and 2002 and they are translated into several European languages.

Selected works

Novels
Και με το φως του λύκου επανέρχονται (With the light of the Wolf, they return), 1993
Με το παράξενο όνομα Ραμάνθις Ερέβους, Ο θάνατος ήρθε τελευταίος (Under the strange name of Ramanthis Erevous: Death came Last), 2001
Με το παράξενο όνομα Ραμάνθις Ερέβους, Το πάθος χιλιάδες φορές (Under the strange name of Ramanthis Erevous: Passion thousands of times), 2009

Short fiction
Περσινή αρραβωνιαστικιά (Last year's fiancée), 1984
Στην ερημιά με χάρι (Graceful in the wilderness), 1986

Non-fiction
O δικός της αέρας (Her Own Wind), 2005
Οι μαγικές βέργες του αδελφού μου, 2006

References

External links
Her entry for the 2001 Frankfurt Book Fair (Greek)
Her page at the website of the Hellenic Authors' Society (Greek) and (English)

1951 births
Living people
Greek women novelists